Lear Wood (12 November 1885 – 31 December 1977) was a Barbadian cricketer. He played in one first-class match for the Barbados cricket team in 1924/25.

See also
 List of Barbadian representative cricketers

References

External links
 

1885 births
1977 deaths
Barbadian cricketers
Barbados cricketers
People from Saint George, Barbados